The 2007 Grand Prix Hassan II was a men's tennis event on the 2007 ATP Tour played in Casablanca, Morocco on clay sourts. It was the 23rd edition of the tournament and was held from 23 April through 29 April. The event was won by Paul-Henri Mathieu in men's singles and Jordan Kerr and David Škoch in men's doubles.

Finals

Singles

 Paul-Henri Mathieu defeated  Albert Montañés 6–1, 6–1

Doubles

 Jordan Kerr /  David Škoch defeated  Łukasz Kubot /  Oliver Marach 7–6(7–4), 1–6, [10–4]

References

External links
 Singles draw
 Doubles draw